The 2012 Tochigi SC season sees Tochigi SC compete in J.League Division 2 for the fourth consecutive season. Tochigi SC are also competing in the 2012 Emperor's Cup.

Players

Competitions

J. League

League table

Matches

Emperor's Cup

References

Tochigi SC
Tochigi SC seasons